Robert Haggiag (5 October 1913 – 1 March 2009) was an Italian-American film producer.

Life

He was born in 1913 in Tripoli, Italian Libya. In 1966 he won a David di Donatello Award for "Best Production".

Filmography
 1950: Ladro di Venezia, Il 
 1954: The Barefoot Contessa
 1965: Signore & signori
 1967: L'immorale
 1968: Candy
 1993: Lady Chatterley

References

External links

American film producers
1913 births
2009 deaths
David di Donatello winners
Italian expatriates in Libya
People from Tripoli, Libya
Italian emigrants to the United States